St Mary's Banagher GAC is a Gaelic Athletic Association club based in the Feeny / Park area of County Londonderry, Northern Ireland. The club is a member of the Derry GAA. Banagher is a dual club and currently caters for Gaelic football, hurling and camogie. The club motto is the Irish Ni neart go misneach, which translates as "No strength like courage".

Underage teams up to U-12s play in North Derry league and championships, from U-14 upwards teams compete in All-Derry competitions. The club was formed in 1965, when St Mary's Park and St Joseph's Banagher amalgamated.

The club have won the Derry Senior Hurling Championship on three occasions and have been runners up three times in the Derry Senior Football Championship

2019 Championship Football

2018 Championship Football

2017 Championship Football

History
Up until 1965, St Mary's Park and St Joseph's Banagher were the two teams in the area. Fr. McNally went about reviving Gaelic football in the area by creating a new team to cover both Feeny and Park. The name was chosen as a compromise between the two old clubs and the maroon and white colours were chosen in recognition of the Galway team who were All-Ireland Champions at the time.

The stag depicted on the crest represents the legend that Saint Muireach O'Heaney (a local Saint) followed a stag to the site where he founded his church, the present day ruins of Banagher Old Church. The mythical beast to the right is a "peiste", which St Muireach is said to have banished into a deep pool in Banagher Glen known as "Lig na Peiste" (pit of the serpent). The mountains at the top of the crest are the Sperrins, which surround Banagher.  The current manager for football is Eamon Lynch.

Players
Seán Marty Lockhart – All Star-winning Derry footballer
Darragh McCloskey – Derry hurler
Brian Óg McGilligan – Derry hurler
Mark Lynch – Former Derry football captain

Gaelic football titles

Senior
Derry Intermediate Football League: 4
1970, 1972, 1996, 2002
Dr Kerlin Cup 9
1976, 1978, 1979, 1980, 1981, 1984, 1987, 1995, 1996, 2016

U-21
North Derry U-21 Football Championship: 1
2006

Minor
Derry Minor Football Championship: 3
1952, 1969, 1976
North Derry Minor Football Championship: 3
1968, 1970, 1998
North Derry Minor Football League: 1
2002
Carlin/Duffy Cup 2
2002, 2008

Under-16
 Derry Under-16 'B' Football Championship: 1
 2009
 Derry Under-16 Football Championship: 1
 2002
 North Derry Under-16 Football Championship: 4
 1985, 2001, 2002, 2006
 North Derry 'A' Under-16 Football League: 3
 1990, 2001, 2002
 North Derry 'B' Under-16 Football League: 1
 1998

Under-14
Derry Under-14 Football Championship: 2
2000, 2004
North Derry Under-14 Football Championship: 3
1987, 2000, 2004
Derry Under-14 'B' Football Championship: 1
2008
Derry Under-14 'B' Feile: 1
2008

Hurling titles

Senior
Derry Senior Hurling Championship: 3
1978, 1980, 2005
Derry Senior Hurling League: 2
1999, 2001
Derry Intermediate Hurling Championship: 4
1989, 1991, 1994, 2021
Ulster Intermediate Club Hurling Championship: 1
2021

Under-21
 Derry Under-21 Hurling Championship:1
 2007

Minor
Derry Minor Hurling Championship: 6
1977, 1992, 1993, 1994, 2002, 2003

Under-16
Derry Under-16 Hurling Championship: 3
2001, 2002, 2006
Derry Under-16 Hurling League: 1
2002

Under-14
Derry Féile na nGael: 2
1999, 2000
Derry Under-14 Hurling League: 1
1984

Under-12
North Derry Under-12 Hurling League: 1
1986

Note: The above lists may be incomplete. Please add any other honours you know of.

See also
Derry Senior Football Championship
Derry Senior Hurling Championship
List of Gaelic games clubs in Derry

References

External links
St Mary's GAC website

Gaelic games clubs in County Londonderry
Gaelic football clubs in County Londonderry
Hurling clubs in County Londonderry